Leelavathi or Lilavati is a Hindu Indian feminine given name, which means "playful" and "goddess durga".

People
 Leelavathi Govindasamy (1944-2017), Malaysian Politician, Doctor and Humanitarian
 Leelavathi (actress) (born 1937), a Kannada film actress
 M. Leelavathy (born 1927), Malayalam writer, literary critic, and educationist
 Lilavati of Polonnaruwa, Sinhalese queen in the 13th century

Other uses
 Leelavati Award, an award for outstanding contribution to public outreach in mathematics in India
 Līlāvatī, mathematics book written by ancient Indian mathematician Bhāskara II; also the daughter of Bhāskara II
 Lilavati, ancient Kannada novel in Hoysala literature
 Lilavati Hospital, established 1978, at Bandra, Bombay, India
 Lilavati's Daughters, a 2008 collection of biographical essays on women scientists of India
 Miss Leelavathi, a 1965 Indian Kannada language film directed by M. R. Vittal

See also
 Līlāvatīsāra, a 13th-century poem composed by Jinaratna
 Sathi Leelavathi (disambiguation)